Gary Allen Brown (born September 9, 1988) is an American former professional baseball outfielder. He played in Major League Baseball (MLB) for the San Francisco Giants.

Amateur career
After graduating from Diamond Bar High School, Brown attended California State University, Fullerton, where he played college baseball for the Cal State Fullerton Titans baseball team. Brown was a near consensus All-American in his final season. In 2008 and 2009, he played collegiate summer baseball with the Orleans Firebirds of the Cape Cod Baseball League and was named a league all-star in 2009. He was selected by the San Francisco Giants in the first round (24th overall) of the 2010 First-Year Player Draft, and signed for a $1.45 million bonus.

Professional career
Brown made his professional debut with the Rookie-level Arizona Giants of the Arizona League and finished the 2010 season with the Single-A Salem-Keizer Volcanoes of the Northwest League. Overall, he hit .159 with two runs batted in (RBI) and two stolen bases in twelve games played.

Brown played the 2011 season with the Single-A Advanced San Jose Giants of the California League. He was named California League Rookie of the Year. Brown was also selected to participate in the 2011 All-Star Futures Game at Chase Field in Phoenix, Arizona. For the season, he batted .336 in 559 at bats and set a franchise record for hits with 188. He also had 13 triples, 14 home runs and 80 RBIs while stealing 53 bases in 72 attempts.  He was named an outfielder on Baseball Americas 2011 Minor League All Star team. Brown was added to the Giants 40-man roster on November 20, 2013.

Brown was called up to the majors for the first time on September 2, 2014. He made his MLB debut the next day.

On March 31, 2015, Brown was designated for assignment by the Giants. He was claimed by the St. Louis Cardinals. Brown was designated by the Cardinals on April 21, and claimed by the Los Angeles Angels of Anaheim on April 22. He was sent to the Triple–A Salt Lake Bees. Brown was released by the Angels in March 2016.

On April 17, 2016, Brown signed with the Southern Maryland Blue Crabs of the Atlantic League of Professional Baseball. He announced his retirement on July 5, 2017.

Personal life
In July 2020, Brown appeared on the television show American Ninja Warrior in the Fourth Qualifying Round in St. Louis.

References

External links

1988 births
Living people
People from Diamond Bar, California
Baseball players from California
Major League Baseball outfielders
San Francisco Giants players
Cal State Fullerton Titans baseball players
All-American college baseball players
Orleans Firebirds players
Arizona League Giants players
Salem-Keizer Volcanoes players
San Jose Giants players
Scottsdale Scorpions players
Richmond Flying Squirrels players
Fresno Grizzlies players
Salt Lake Bees players
Memphis Redbirds players
Southern Maryland Blue Crabs players